Matthew Mendy (born 13 June 1983 in Serekunda) is a football defender from Gambia, he currently plays for FC Jazz in the Finnish second tier Ykkönen. Mendy was signed by Jazz in August 2014.

Career
From 2001 to 2007 Mendy was studying in the United States and played for Alabama A&M Bulldogs and George Mason Patriots. In April 2007 he was transferred to German team KFC Uerdingen 05 and later to 1. FC Kleve. After only one month with Kleve he was signed by Erste Liga club 1. FC Vöcklabruck. Mendy has also played in China, Sweden, Malta and in 2013–2014 for Feni Soccer Club in Bangladesh Premier League.

International
Mendy has capped nine times for the Gambia national football team

References

1983 births
Living people
Gambian footballers
The Gambia international footballers
The Gambia youth international footballers
Alabama A&M Bulldogs men's soccer players
George Mason Patriots men's soccer players
KFC Uerdingen 05 players
Anhui Jiufang players
China League One players
Balzan F.C. players
FC Jazz players
Gambian expatriate footballers
Expatriate footballers in Germany
Expatriate footballers in Austria
Expatriate footballers in China
Expatriate footballers in Sweden
Expatriate footballers in Malta
Expatriate footballers in Bangladesh
Expatriate footballers in Finland
People from Serekunda
Association football midfielders
Kokkolan Palloveikot players
Gamtel FC players
Feni SC players